Ghumarwin is a town and a municipal council, near the town of Bilaspur in Bilaspur district in the North Indian State of Himachal Pradesh and is the second largest town of the entire district. The town is an anchor point for commuters between Bilaspur and Hamirpur and other parts of the state. Situated primarily between the Hills of Lower Central Himalayas, Ghumarwin is situated at an average elevation of 700 metres or about 2300 ft. above sea level. It is one of the biggest commercial centres of Bilaspur District and one can find all kinds of shops, stores, services etc. here. 

It has become a major cultural and educational hub of Bilaspur and is a rapidly emerging city located on a sharp small rivulet Seer Khud's bank in a small valley which diverts towards Bilaspur city. The town celebrates a famous four-day fair at the dawn of summer in first week of April which is one of its chief tourism attractions. The town is also a tehsil and home to rapidly expanding entrepreneurship along with the tehsildar office and court. Spread in all four directions the town is growing rapidly National Highway 103 passes through  Ghumarwin, State Highway 19 Terminates here connecting it with Northern Rural regions of the district. It is also famous for its variety of sweet preparations and local cuisines which people come to enjoy from far and wide.  

Situated on Shimla-Kangra Road formerly NH 88 (Now NH 88 A) it is well connected to rest of neighbouring states. HRTC, CTU, Haryana Roadways, Uttarakhand Roadways and Punjab Roadways buses and taxis operate to nearly all possible routes on each sides. Ghumarwin is situated at a distance of 105 km from the state capital Shimla, 22 km from Bilaspur, the district Headquarter of Bilaspur. HRTC Volvo and Ordinary Buses also operates to the National Capital. In February 2019.  

Despite of lying in the lower Himalayan region Nihari, a suburb of Ghumarwin experienced snowfall after 4 decades. In coming future is going to be connected by four lane in all directions. The Kiratpur-Nerchowk Expressway four lane project will come near Bhager which is 7 km away. Ghumarwin is also connected to Kuthera 12 km. away which is another fast developing sub center by two lane highway.

Demographics 
As of 2011 India census, Ghumarwin had a population of 7900. Rural population comprises 102000 people. Males constitute 53% of the population and females 47%. Ghumarwin has an average literacy rate of 80%, higher than the national average of 74%: male literacy is 80%, and female literacy is 76%. In Ghumarwin, 10% of the population is under 6 years.

Medical Facilities 
Ghumarwin is one of the chief centers for good quality medical care in the area and being surrounded by rural population it becomes the main place for hospitals. The Civil Hospital of Ghumarwin provides all essential medical facilities along with multiple private hospitals, clinics and pharmaceutical shops. The AIIMS Bilaspur which is currently under construction will be 30 km. away and will be operational by 2021. Ghumarwin is also well connected to IGMC Shimla and PGIMER Chandigarh via National Highways.

Connectivity 

Ghumarwin is a central location and can be reached by car, bus from any direction. It is extremely well connected by state and public bus services to Chandigarh, Delhi, Ambala, Bilaspur, Shimla, Dharmashala, Mandi, Hamirpur, Una, Solan, Kiratpur, Ropar, Nalagarh, Baddi, Panchkula, Haridwar, Dehradun, Kala Amb and many more places. It is centrally distanced to all the three airports in Bhuntar(128 km.), Gagaal(104 km.) and Shimla(105 km.) and will be only 60 km away from the upcoming International airport at Mandi. 

The nearest railway stations are located at Kiratpur and Una which are well connected to other parts of the state and nearby areas. Also the upcoming Bhanupli–Leh line which is the highest railway line in the world and will be an all weather rail link from Bhanupalli, Punjab to Leh will be accessible from Ghumarwin as well opening up new opportunities for the people of the area.   

The New 4 Lane Project connecting Kiratpur to Manali via Bhager- Nerchowk will be accessible only 7 km away from Ghumarwin. The 4 lane project is currently under construction and shall be complete by 2022 as 70% project is complete. 

Taxi services are easily available to and from the town to all parts of the state and other states and major cities at very affordable rates.

Notable people

Jagat Prakash Nadda, National President of the  Bharatiya Janta Party
Bhandari Ram, Victoria cross
 Sanjay Kumar, Param Vir Chakra awardee
 Rattan Chand, Senior Bureaucrat
Yami Gautam, Bollywood actress

Educational institutions

 Govt. Sr. Sec. School, Talyana
 Jai Him Jyoti Sr. Sec. School, Talyana
 Matrix-Academy Ghumarwin
 Swami Vivekanand Government College: It offers UG and PG courses like BA/BSc/BCom and MA/MSc. .
 Government Senior Secondary School (Boys & Girls)
 Government Senior Secondary School (Girls)
 D.A.V. Public School
 College of Education
 Him Sarvodya Senior Secondary School
 Vision Convent School
 S.V.M High School
 Om Shanti Public School
 Govt Senior Secondary School Dadhol
 Minerva Public Sr. Sec. School
 Adarsh High School Ghumarwin
 Kendreya Vidyalaya Ghumarwin
 Navalok Adarsh Vidyalaya Khansra(Mehrin Kathla)
 Shivalik Publik School Marhana.Tel Ghumarwin
 YEN Law college (under construction camps site) Dakhiut Dangar Ghumarwin
 GSSS Panoh
 Thomson Public School Ghumarwin
 Holy Heart Public High School Ghumarwin
 Mind Roots Institute of Commerce and Training

References

govt SS School Morshighi

Cities and towns in Bilaspur district, Himachal Pradesh